The legislative districts of Oriental Mindoro are the representations of the province of Oriental Mindoro in the various national legislatures of the Philippines. The province is currently represented in the lower house of the Congress of the Philippines through its first and second congressional districts.

History 

Prior to gaining separate representation, areas now under the jurisdiction of Oriental Mindoro were represented under the lone district of the undivided Mindoro Province from 1898 to 1951.

The enactment of Republic Act No. 505 on June 13, 1950 split the old Mindoro Province into Occidental Mindoro and Oriental Mindoro, and provided each of them separate representation in Congress. Pursuant to Section 6 of Republic Act No. 505, the incumbent representative of Mindoro began to represent only Oriental Mindoro in the second half of the 2nd Congress, following the election of Occidental Mindoro's separate representative in a special election held on the same day as the 1951 senatorial elections.

Oriental Mindoro was represented in the Interim Batasang Pambansa as part of Region IV-A from 1978 to 1984, and returned two representatives, elected at large, to the Regular Batasang Pambansa in 1984.

Under the new Constitution which was proclaimed on February 11, 1987, the province was reapportioned into two congressional districts; each elected its member to the restored House of Representatives starting that same year.

Current districts

Defunct districts

Lone District (defunct) 

Notes

At-Large (defunct)

See also 
Legislative district of Mindoro

References 

Oriental Mindoro
Politics of Oriental Mindoro